The Illinois House of Representatives elections of 2008 determined the membership of the lower house of the 96th General Assembly.  The Democratic Party increased its Majority.

Overview

References

Sources
Illinois State Board of Elections

House of Representatives
2008
Illinois House